Paul C. Bandy (born 1944) is an American politician who served as a member of the New Mexico House of Representatives from January 2007 to January 2021.

Education
Bandy attended the University of Houston and University of Texas at Austin.

Elections
2012: Bandy was unopposed for both the June 5, 2012 Republican Primary, winning with 1,706 votes and the November 6, 2012 General election, winning with 7,775 votes.
2006: When District 3 Republican Representative Sandra Townsend retired and left the seat open, Bandy was unopposed for both the June 6, 2006 Republican Primary, winning with 1,257 votes and the November 7, 2006 General election, winning with 5,591 votes.
2008: Bandy was unopposed for both the June 8, 2008 Republican Primary, winning with 1,712 votes and the November 4, 2008 General election, winning with 8,335 votes.
2010: Bandy was unopposed for both the June 1, 2010 Republican Primary, winning with 2,247 votes and the November 2, 2010 General election, winning with 6,997 votes.

References

External links
Official page at the New Mexico Legislature
Campaign site

Paul Bandy at Ballotpedia
Paul C. Bandy at the National Institute on Money in State Politics

Place of birth missing (living people)
Living people
Republican Party members of the New Mexico House of Representatives
People from Aztec, New Mexico
University of Houston alumni
University of Texas at Austin alumni
21st-century American politicians
1944 births